Ipetumoduis a city in Osun State, in the southwestern part of Nigeria. It is the headquarters of the Ife North local government. The city is under the leadership of traditional ruler with the title of Apetumodu, which means "one who killed an antelope for sacrificial purposes for Odu".

History
Ipetumodu was founded by the warriors Obatala and Orunmila (both are contemporaries of Oduduwa). They came from Ile-Ife to settle near River Isasa. Their group fought and drove away the Igbo aborigines of Ile-Ife who left their original homeland to settle near the river isasa in Ipetumodu from where they came to invade Ile-Ife. But the Igbo pleaded with them not to trouble them or drive them away from their new abode. Obatala was named "Oseremaigbo" while Orunmila was named "Barapetu". Inspite their pleading by the igbo, they were finally driven out of the Ipetumodu.

Orunmila and Obatala later left Ipetumodu for Ile-Ife, but left Akalako the son of Obatala in the city. Akalako then became the first king of the city.

Ipetumodu and the Nineteen Century Yoruba War 
During the Owu War (1812-1822), Isope and Iwaro, two Ipetumodu villages, were attacked thereby causing the Exodus of many people. It was after the war that the two villages were rebuilt. Ipetumodu witnessed the arrival of large number of war refugees from Apomu during the Ganamu war. The refugees deserted their town in order to escape the impending invasion by the Ibadan army. The people of Ipetumodu repelled most of the military advances of the Ibadan into their territory.

Hukuhuku war 
Between 1839 and 1848, Ipetumodu had its own share of the Fulani attack on Yorubaland. A Mohammedan at
Iwo called Mohomi invited the Fulanis of Ilorin to extend their conquest to the towns of Eastern districts of Yorubaland. The Fulani secretly entered ipetumodu from Osogbo end and succeeded in killing several people including the military head of Ipetumodu, balogun Adewusi. So tough was the invasion that the reigning Apetumodu, Oba Folasade Ajiga, with many chiefs and families fled to Ile-Ife for safety. He died in Ile-Ife in 1842. It was Lafiani popular known as “Arakatampo pa Hukuhuku” (He who used crossbows to kill Hukuhuku) that led the remnants of the Ipetumodu warriors to dislodge the Fulani marauders from Ipetumodu. After the Fulani marauders were dislodged from Ipetumodu, Oba Olakanmi Okoro Giesi succeeded Oba Folashade Ajiga as the Apetumodu and he was responsible for the reconstruction of the war-ravaged town.

The 1886 Peace Treaty 
The 1886 peace treaty initiated by the British to put an end to the Yoruba civil strife also had some traumatic effects on Ipetumodu. The treaty had stipulated that Modakeke , who had been at constant wars with their fellow Ife host , would be resettled temporarily in Ipetumodu, Moro and Edunabon and other Origbo towns before their final resettlement by the Osun-Odo Oba confluence between Iwo and Ibadan.

The British authorities however, failed to implement the treaty to the letter early enough and on the 27th of March, 1909, some Modakeke refugees settled in Owu Ipole, Gbongan, Edunabon, Ede, Lasole and Akanle while many others led by the reigning Ogunsua settled in Ode Omu (which was Originally part of the farmland of Ipetumodu people). On Sunday, 18 July 1909, the Modakekes suddenly and surreptitiously displaced the Ipetumodu farmers who had gone to celebrate the annual "Egungun festival" from their farms.

The British authorities later endorsed the permanent settlement of Modakeke refugees on Ipetumodu land without any compensation.

Political History 
Between 1943 and 1947, Ipetumodu belonged to the Origbo People’s Assembly which was represented by six members, which happened to be the highest number in the assembly. The assembly was later changed to Origbo Subordinate Native Authority in 1948 and it lasted till 1954. Ipetumodu had nine out of the twenty members that were made up of the Authority. From 1955 to 1966, ipetumodu was the headquarters of one of the four components of the Ife Divisional Council then known as Ipetumodu Local Council the council consists of thirty members of which twenty-one members are from Ipetumodu, four members from Asipa, three members from Akinlalu while two members are from Yakooyo. Six members from Ipetumodu Local Council could represent it at the Ife Division Council level.

In 1980, Governor Bola Ige, the then Governor of Oyo state grouped Origbo towns as Oranmiyan Local Government Area with headquarters in Ipetumodu. However, the local government was phased out during the regime of Mohammodu Buhari. In the year 1989, the Ife North Local government was created and Ipetumodu has been the headquarters since then.

Geography 

Ipetumodu is located in Yorubaland in western Nigeria. It is located in the high forest also called rain forest. The annual rainfall is estimated to be between 130 and 150 centimeters annually, and humidity of over 80%. This high humidity and long raining season support the cultivation of perennial cash crops such as cocoa and kolanut tree. Although the town is now fairly urbanized the hinterland west and east of the town centre is home to cocoa, oil palm and kolanut plantation which are usually own by private individual from the town.

Ipetumodu is the headquarters of the Ife North local government of Osun State Nigeria. The city is about 218 kilometers from Lagos, the commercial capital of Nigeria. It shares a boundary with Ile-Ife which is the spiritual headquarters of the Yoruba people, Yakooyo, Asipa, Akinlalu, Gbongan and Ode-Omu.

Education

Ipetumodu has many primary and secondary schools both private and public own. Ipetumodu is home to one of the federal government owned unity schools; Federal Government Girls College, Ipetumodu which was established in 1995.

Ipetumodu is a university town of Oduduwa University, located at Ife-Ibadan Expressway Roundabout, Ipetumodu.

Markets
Ipetumodu has two markets. Obada market is held every fifth day and is located at the city center. Akinola market is held every Friday. It was strategically located near Ife-Ibadan expressway, which makes it one of the popular markets in Osun state.

Notable People 

 Isaac Adeagbo Akinjogbin, Academic, Writer, and Historian.
 Femi Adesina, Special Adviser to President Buhari on media and publicity.
 Solomon Babalola, Nigerian academic, poet and scholar

See also
Baakun

References 

Populated places in Osun State
Towns in Yorubaland